Allopumiliotoxin 267A is a toxin found in the skin of several poison frogs of the family Dendrobates. It is a member of the class of compounds known as allopumiliotoxins.  The frogs produce the toxin by modifying the original version, pumiliotoxin 251D. It has been tested on mice and found to be five times more potent than the former version. It has been produced synthetically through a variety of different routes.

See also 
 Pumiliotoxin
 Allopumiliotoxin

References 

Vertebrate toxins
Alkaloids
Ion channel toxins
Vicinal diols